Rising Sun is an unincorporated community located in Leflore County, Mississippi. Some citizens refer to the area north of Rising Sun near the Hwy 82 and Hwy 49E intersection in Greenwood as being Rising Sun but the area is known as Craigside.

It is part of the Greenwood, Mississippi micropolitan area.

Rising Sun is located on the Canadian National Railway. A post office operated under the name Rising Sun from 1887 to 1912.

In 1900, the community had a population of 72.

References

Unincorporated communities in Leflore County, Mississippi
Unincorporated communities in Mississippi
Greenwood, Mississippi micropolitan area